Apollo is the fourth studio album by stoner rock band Nebula, released in 2006. The album was reissued in 2022 by the band's current label, Heavy Psych Sounds Records.

Some enhanced copies of the CD include a video of Nebula playing the song "Future Days" live in Japan.

Track listing
All songs written by Eddie Glass/Ruben Romano
 "Orbit" – 0:39
 "Loose Cannon" – 4:00
 "Fever Fray" – 2:12
 "Lightbringer" – 3:13
 "Future Days" – 4:35
 "Ghost Ride" – 3:00
 "The Alchemist" – 2:51
 "Trapezium Procession" – 1:01
 "Controlled" – 1:48
 "The Eagle Has Landed" – 4:20
 "Fruit of My Soul" – 2:49
 "Decadent Garden" – 2:50
 "Wired" – 0:55
 "Opiate Float" – 3:55

Personnel
Eddie Glass – guitar, vocals, drums, keyboard
Ruben Romano – drums, vocals, guitar, keyboard, sitar
Tom Davies – bass, vocals
Produced By Daniel Rey & Nebula

References

External links
 Nebula's Official website
 Apollo

2006 albums
Nebula (band) albums
Albums produced by Daniel Rey